Late Blossom (lit. "I Love You") is a 2011 South Korean film written and directed by Choo Chang-min about the love story of two elderly couples.

After opening quietly to little fanfare, the indie slowly gained positive word-of-mouth and critical praise, and eventually became a box office success with over 1,645,505 ticket sales, as well as a cultural darling among industry peers.

The film is based on the manhwa I Love You by Kang Full. It was serialized online in 2007 and later published in three volumes. In 2008, it was turned into a play and drew audiences of more than 120,000 by 2010.

Plot
The movie revolves around four senior citizens living in a hillside village. Kim Man-seok is a cranky milkman with a short fuse and a foul mouth. He wakes the village early each morning with his noisy, battered motorcycle. He meets Song Ee-peun, who scavenges for scrap paper while roaming around the town at daybreak. As they meet again and again, they slowly develop feelings for each other.

Ms. Song parks her handcart at a junkyard and sees Jang Kun-bong, the caretaker of the parking lot next to the scrap yard. One day, Kun-bong wakes up late and forgets to lock his door and asks Ms. Song to fasten it for him. Meanwhile, Jang's Alzheimer's-afflicted wife Soon-yi wanders around the town, ending up on the back of Man-seok's motorbike.

Cast
Lee Soon-jae - Kim Man-seok
Yoon So-jung - Song Ee-peun
Song Jae-ho - Jang Kun-bong
Kim Soo-mi - Jo Soon-yi
Shin Soo-yeon - Hwang Min-ji
Oh Dal-su - Dal-su
Song Ji-hyo - Kim Yeon-ah
Kim Hyung-jun - Jung Min-chae
Lee Sang-hoon - Duk-bae
Lee Moon-sik - Scratch
Gil Hae-yeon - Kun-bong's daughter-in-law 1
Jo Jae-yoon - Kun-bong's brother-in-law
Kwon Bum-taek - Man-seok's wife's doctor
Lee Chae-eun - young Ee-peun 
Kang Hyun-joong - young Sang-tae 
Lee Jun-hyeok - photographer
Ra Mi-ran - nurse
Lee Bong-ryun as Dong Office employee
Jeon Bae-soo - public officer of small neighborhood office
Lee Moon-su - Duk-bae's father
Kim Hyang-gi - street light kid

Box office
The sleeper hit eventually recouped four times its cost in just a few weeks, attracting 1,645,505 admissions and grossing more than  domestically.

Spin-off
A same-titled 16-episode television series spin-off starring Kim Hyung-jun aired on SBS Plus from April to June 2012. Of the movie cast members, only Lee Soon-jae reprised his role.

Awards
2011 Blue Dragon Film Awards: Best Supporting Actress - Kim Soo-mi 
2011 China Golden Rooster and Hundred Flowers Film Festival: Best Actor, International Film category - Lee Soon-jae

References

External links 
  
  
 
 
 

2011 films
2011 romantic drama films
South Korean romantic drama films
Films about suicide
Films shot in Incheon
Films based on manhwa
Films based on works by Kang Full
Films directed by Choo Chang-min
Next Entertainment World films
2010s Korean-language films
Live-action films based on comics
2010s South Korean films